The Wrought Iron Range Company Building is a Tudor Revival style building in St. Louis, Missouri that was built in 1926. The Wrought Iron Range Company was founded by Henry Harrison Culver and his brothers Walter and Licius. It was listed on the National Register of Historic Places in 2004.

It was designed in 1925 by St. Louis architect by Albert Knell.  It is a two-story steel frame and brick building with a stuccoed and half-timbered second story.  It has a hipped roof with a series of cross gables and brick piers that simulate chimneys.

References

Tudor Revival architecture in Missouri
Commercial buildings completed in 1926
Buildings and structures in St. Louis
Commercial buildings on the National Register of Historic Places in Missouri
National Register of Historic Places in St. Louis
Downtown West, St. Louis
1926 establishments in Missouri